This article concerns the period 139 BC – 130 BC.

References

Bibliography